Chapman Lake is a reservoir located in Warren County, Pennsylvania entirely within the Chapman State Park. Chapman State Park is a 862 acre state park that opens from sunrise to sunset. 
The lake is formed by the disbandment of the West Branch of the Tionesta Creek. The lake spans 68 acres and has fishing for both warm-water and cold-water fish. The park is off US 6, near the town of Clarendon. The nearest hospital is warren general hospital.

References

See also
List of lakes in Pennsylvania

Reservoirs in Pennsylvania
Protected areas of Warren County, Pennsylvania
Bodies of water of Warren County, Pennsylvania